Raphael Luz Pessoa (born 18 July 1989) is a Brazilian footballer, who plays as an attacking midfielder for Boa Esporte.

Biography 
Raphael Luz is a playmaker formed by São Paulo Futebol Clube (2006-2008). After that he played in clubs like Cruzeiro and Goiás. Raphael Luz is a playmaker who started his career at São Paulo Futebol Clube (2006–2008). After that he played in clubs like Cruzeiro, Goiás and Bahia. In January 2015 he arrived to Cuiabá Esporte Clube. In 2015, he was champion with Cuiabá of Copa Verde and Mato Grosso state League.

Raphael Luz scored 8 goals in Copa Verde, being the top scorer of the tournament scoring three goals in the final game against Remo. He was elected the best player of  Copa Verde 2015 and the best player also of the Mato Grosso state league 2015. In the final game of the state league, Raphael Luz also scored a goal in the 1×1 draw against Operário.

Titles
Cuiabá
 Campeonato Mato-Grossense: 2015
 Copa Verde: 2015

Paysandu
 Campeonato Paraense: 2016
 Copa Verde: 2016

Individual titles
Best player of Mato Grosso state league 2015 
Top Scorer and best player of the Copa Verde (Green Cup)

References

External links
 Artilheiro da Copa Verde, Raphael Luz comanda vitória heroica do Dourado 
 Com show de Raphael Luz, Cuiabá consegue 'milagre'  e é Campeão da Copa Verde 2015 
 Raphael Luz abre o placar para o Cuiabá na final da Copa Verde
 

1989 births
Living people
Sportspeople from Goiânia
Brazilian footballers
Campeonato Brasileiro Série A players
Campeonato Brasileiro Série B players
Campeonato Brasileiro Série C players
Campeonato Brasileiro Série D players
São Paulo FC players
Esporte Clube Bahia players
Atlético Clube Goianiense players
Esporte Clube Novo Hamburgo players
Goiânia Esporte Clube players
Associação Atlética Aparecidense players
Goiás Esporte Clube players
Associação Atlética Anapolina players
Cuiabá Esporte Clube players
Paysandu Sport Club players
Botafogo Futebol Clube (PB) players
Oeste Futebol Clube players
Associação Ferroviária de Esportes players
Boa Esporte Clube players
Esporte Clube Água Santa players
Association football midfielders